Angels Camp Museum is a history museum located in Angels Camp, California, in the United States. The museum focuses on the history of the California Gold Rush. It spreads out between four buildings and features a collection of twenty-nine restored horse-drawn carriages.

History
Angels Mine dates back to the 1850s. The museum sits on a portion of the mine land claim, where two of the three veins of the Mother Lode meet. Approximately  of tunnels and shafts are located in Angels Mine, which was named after goldminer Henry Angel.  the museum director is Bob Rogers. The museum also owns the Altaville Grammar School, the state's oldest extant schoolhouse. Each year the museum waives its entry charges to host Gold Rush Day, celebrating the heritage of the gold rush with demonstrations, music, food, and costumed interpreters.

Collection and exhibition
The museum's collection focuses primary on early mining equipment. Other objects held in the collection include gold rush-era minerals, a nineteenth-century slot machine, a telephone switchboard used at Angels Camp, and twenty-nine restored horse-drawn vehicles. They have a replica of the area's original section of the Sierra Railroad. The museum also has films, historical photographs and general objects from the time period, such as typewriters and interior parts from the post office located at the historic Angels Camp. The main building has exhibitions featuring antiques and historical objects, and a small theater which shows the film Jump, a documentary about the Frog Jump Jubilee, an annual frog jumping contest. A garage on the property showcases the carriages, and another building features mining equipment.

References

External links
Official website
Angels Camp Museum Foundation

Museums in Calaveras County, California
Mining museums in California
Carriage museums in the United States
Transportation museums in California